Timothy Dwyer, better known by his stage name Horse MacGyver (and formerly by the stylized moniker ///▲▲▲\\\), is an Australian artist and electronic musician from Canberra.

In 2010, Dwyer released an untitled EP under the name ///▲▲▲\\\ on the American label Disaro Records, which was limited to run of fifty hand-numbered CD-Rs. Due to the EP's scarcity, the songs from it were combined with new material and released later that year as a full-length cassette-only album, Void, on both Dwyer's own label Bad Sound and the Canberra-based label Dream Damage. In that same year, Dwyer's output was referred to by Pitchfork as a pioneering effort in the genre known as drag, or witch house.

In 2011, Dwyer released a split 7-inch vinyl w/ fellow witch house artist Gr†llGr†ll.

In 2019, Dwyer released an album entitled "DEEP FAKES" through Melbourne based record label "Nice Music." The album received a positive review in the November 2019 issue of WIRE magazine. Stating that the album "Deep Fakes feels like a missing link between a certain 1990's tendency and the present. It channels the hyperactive playfulness of producers like Luke Vibert and Squarepusher in all their sleepy but sleep-deprived delirium... But Dwyer updates it with the no less twitchy pathology evident in current producers..."

Dwyer’s most recent release, END EFFECTOR, was launched in April 2022 by “Nice Music” and exists as a debut vinyl LP document for the artist.

References

Australian artists
Australian electronic musicians
Australian National University alumni
People from Canberra
Living people
Year of birth missing (living people)